The Tower of Senetosa is a Genoese tower located in the commune of Sartène (Corse-du-Sud) on the west coast of the Corsica.

History
The tower was built in 1610. It was one of a series of coastal defences constructed by the Republic of Genoa between 1530 and 1620 to stem the attacks by Barbary pirates. In 1992, the tower was listed as one of the official historical monuments of France.

Since 1979, the tower has been owned and maintained by the French government agency, the Conservatoire du littoral. The agency plans to purchase  of the headland and as of 2011 had acquired .

See also
List of Genoese towers in Corsica

References

External links
 Includes information on how to reach 90 towers and many photographs.

Towers in Corsica
Monuments historiques of Corsica